The Men's cycling sprint at the 2011 Dutch National Track Championships in Apeldoorn took place at Omnisport Apeldoorn on December 30, 2011. 21 athletes participated in the contest.

Teun Mulder won the gold medal, Hugo Haak took silver and Roy van den Berg won the bronze.

Competition format

The tournament consisted of an initial 200 m time trial with a flying start. The top 12 athletes advanced to the first round. The first round comprised head-to-head races based on seeding. The winners of those four heats advanced to the quarter-finals, the losers to the repaches. The event was further a single-elimination tournament. Each race pitted two cyclists against each other in the best-of-three races. Each race was three laps of the track with side-by-side starts.

Results

Qualification round
A 200 m time trial with a flying start. The top 12 athletes advanced to the first round.

Round 1
The winner of each heat advanced to the quarter-finals, the other riders to the repaches.

Heat 1

Heat 2

Heat 3

Heat 4

Heat 5

Heat 4

Repaches
The winner of each heat advanced to the quarter-finals.

Heat 1

Heat 2

Quarter-finals
The winner of each quarter-final (best of 3) advanced to the semi-finals. The other riders went to the 5th – 8th place classification sprint.

Quarter-final 1

Quarter-final 2

Quarter-final 3

Quarter-final 4

Classification sprints

9th – 12th place

5th – 8th place

Semi-finals
The winner of each semi-final (best of 3) advanced to the  gold medal race. The other two riders  went to the bronze medal race.

Semi-final 1

Semi-final 2

Finals
Bronze medal match

Gold medal match

Final results

Results from nkbaanwielrennen.nl.

References

2011 Dutch National track cycling championships
Dutch National Track Championships – Men's sprint